Diano may refer to:

Places
Diano Arentino, municipality of the Province of Imperia, Liguria
Diano Castello, municipality of the Province of Imperia, Liguria
Diano d'Alba, municipality of the Province of Cuneo, Piedmont
Diano Marina, municipality of the Province of Imperia, Liguria
Diano San Pietro, municipality of the Province of Imperia, Liguria
Diano, the ancient name of Teggiano, a municipality in the province of Salerno (Campania)
Vallo di Diano, a geographical region of the Province of Salerno (Campania)

People
Gaspard de Diano (1389–1451), Neapolitan bishop
Giacinto Diano (1731-1803), Italian painter
Diano (footballer) (born 1981), Brazilian footballer

See also
Diana (disambiguation)
Diane (disambiguation)
Diani Beach